is a JR West Kabe Line station located in Yagi, Asaminami-ku, Hiroshima, Hiroshima Prefecture, Japan. The station was formerly named Yagi-Bairin Station.

Station layout
Bairin Station features one island platform handling two tracks. The station building is to the west of the platform, and a railway crossing connects the platform and station building. The station is staffed during weekdays.

Platforms

History
1910-12-25: Bairin Station opens
1987-04-01: Japanese National Railways is privatized, and Bairin Station becomes a JR West station

Surrounding area
 Japan National Route 54
Yagi Post Office
JR West Geibi Line Kumura Station is located about 1.5 km east of Bairin Station
Hiroshima Bairin Elementary School
Hiroshima Jōyama Junior High School
Ōta River

External links

 JR West

Kabe Line
Hiroshima City Network
Stations of West Japan Railway Company in Hiroshima city
Railway stations in Japan opened in 1910